Mechanical impedance is a measure of how much a structure resists motion when subjected to a harmonic force. It relates forces with velocities acting on a mechanical system. The mechanical impedance of a point on a structure is the ratio of the force applied at a point to the resulting velocity at that point.

Mechanical impedance is the inverse of mechanical admittance or mobility. The mechanical impedance is a function of the frequency  of the applied force and can vary greatly over frequency. At resonant frequencies, the mechanical impedance will be lower, meaning less force is needed to cause a structure to move at a given velocity.  A simple example of this is pushing a child on a swing.  For the greatest swing amplitude, the frequency of the pushes must be near the resonant frequency of the system.

Mechanical impedance is the ratio of a potential (e.g. force) to a flow (e.g. velocity) where the arguments of the real (or imaginary) parts of both increase linearly with time. Examples of potentials are: force, sound pressure, voltage, temperature. Examples of flows are: velocity, volume velocity, current, heat flow. Impedance is the reciprocal of mobility. If the potential and flow quantities are measured at the same point then impedance is referred as driving point impedance; otherwise, transfer impedance.

Resistance - the real part of an impedance. 
Reactance - the imaginary part of an impedance.

See also 
Acoustic impedance
Frequency response
Impedance analogy
Linear response function

References 

Physical quantities